This is a list of county courthouses in South Carolina.  Each county in South Carolina has a courthouse in the county seat.

See also

List of United States federal courthouses in South Carolina

County courthouses in South Carolina
Courthouses
South Carolina
Courthouses, county